Naud may refer to:

Persons
 Albert Naud, French actor appearing in Life Love Death (1968) and Mourir d'aimer (1971)
 Daniel Naud (born 1962), Canadian ice hockey player
 Laurent Naud (1909–1992), Quebec businessman operating a wood and building materials business in Sainte-Thècle
 Pierrick Naud (born 1991), Canadian cyclist

Toponyms 
 Naud Junction, an area in northern Downtown Los Angeles, California
 Saint-Loup-de-Naud, French commune of Seine-et-Marne
 Calvaire Alexandre-Naud, a monument in the town of Deschambault-Grondines, Quebec, on the list of historic places in Capitale-Nationale

French-language surnames